is a railway station in the city of Seto, Aichi Prefecture, Japan, operated by the third sector Aichi Loop Railway Company.

Lines

Station layout
The station has two elevated opposed side platforms, with the station building located underneath. The station building has automated ticket machines, TOICA automated turnstiles and is staffed.

Adjacent stations

Station history
Setoshi Station was opened on January 31, 1988 together with the establishment of the Aichi Loop Railway Company.

Passenger statistics
In fiscal 2017, the station was used by an average of 6339 passengers daily.

Surrounding area
 Seto Fire Department
 Suinan Elementary School

See also
 List of railway stations in Japan

References

External links

Official home page 

Railway stations in Japan opened in 1988
Railway stations in Aichi Prefecture
Seto, Aichi